The dictionary gives the meaning of the Sanskrit or Tamil expression, Sutram (सूत्रम्) or Sutra (सूत्र), as string or thread, formula, short sentence or aphoristic rule, girdle, stroke, yarn or plan. Unique to Sanskrit literature, Tamil literature and Pali literature of Hinduism, Jainism and Buddhism, they are short cryptic sentences, methodically written as memory-aids, stringing step by step a particular topic or text in its entirety. There are hundreds of Sanskrit texts found written in the Sutra-format such as Kapila Sutram, Samkhya-pravachana Sutram, Brahma Sutra, Jaimini Sutram, Tatvartha Sutram, Kalpa Sutra, etc.

Etymology
Shatapatha Brahmana defines Sutram as the sacred thread (SB XII.ii.3), the sacred thread belonging to the first-class Brahmins (SB V.x.16), the power to act (SB XI.iii.37), the sutra-tattva (SB XI.xxviii.16), the mahat-tattva distinguished by the power of action (SB XI.ix.19), the function of Pradhana or the subtle cause of material nature (SB XI.xii.19), or the first transformation of nature (Prakrti), endowed with the potency of activity (SB XI.xxiv.6). Thus, it is the sacred thread that is worn by the twice-born i.e. the Brahmins and the Kshatriyas, signifying their initiation, which initiation gives them the opening or the right and the power to act in accordance with their respective dharmas; it constantly reminds them of their obligatory duties. It is also the thread that runs through, binds and activates the stages of transformation from the Avyakta (the Undefined) to the Vyakta (the Defined).

Four main divisions
There are four main divisions of Kalpa: Shrauta Sutram, Grihya Sutram, Dharma Sutram and Kalpa Sutram, and three subordinate divisions: Kaushika Sutram, Vaitana Sutram and Shulba Sutram. Kalpa represents the principle of transformation-transformation of point values, taking into consideration the totality of expression.
Sutram, also known as Sutratman, is the Suksmasariram comprising the vijnanamayakosha, manomayakosha and pranomayakosha; Prana ("vital breath"), Manas ("mind") and "understanding", these three sheaths have the nature of Sutratman. Sutram is an adjunct of Hiranyagarbha who is the origin of Viraj, the gross material constituting the world. Vijnanam is Sutram, and even though Sutram preceded Viraj as the cause of Viraj there is no difference between these two, for when there is no product i.e. Viraj, Sutram has the compact form of Prajnanaghanarupa (intelligence), it then reverts to its true undefined state.

In the Buddhist lexicon emphasis is on the meanings of the Sutras, the Sutras of the teaching of Aksayamati explain that the sutras of expedient meaning are those that teach seeming reality. The sutras of definitive meaning are those that are taught in order to reveal the ultimate reality. The former assist entry on to the path, deal with the seeming, afflicted by phenomena, how to engage in proper actions, cause weariness with cyclic existence, teach variety of terms and definitions, give detailed explanations about the sentient beings, self, etc.,. The latter guide disciples to engage in fruition, teaches about purified phenomena, shows how karmas and afflictions become exhausted, demonstrate that the cyclic existence and nirvana are indifferentiable, teaches the profound true reality that is difficult to see and realize, focuses on precise and pithy instructions for cultivating meditative concentration and teaches about the three doors to liberation, non-application, non-organizing, etc.,.

Sri Aurobindo had said that the fundamental necessity of our embodied life is to seek infinite creativity on a finite basis, therefore, according to the Theosophists death is a transformative experience. Sutratman, the spiritual thread, thread of life, is the Monad, the golden thread of the transcendent contexts on which all the immanent incarnate of each individual human are strung like pearls on a thread.

The subtle principle of life is that thread whereon this life and the next life and all beings are strung (Brihadaranyaka Upanishad III.vii.2). Vayu is also known as Sutratman and Sutratman is svatahsiddha i.e. self-established. It is through Vak (speech) a devotee attains the nature of Sutratman (Saptanna Brahmana verse 329). Viraj is described as the god marked by spatial directions, etc., who wears a body consisting of the five elements and who arises in/from the notion- "I am everything", before that it was Sutratman.

The Sun is identified with the Breath-spirit, and every being is connected with the Sun by a thread of Breath, the Sutratman, that is also a ray of light. The soul or God, as pervading the totality, is called Sutratman.

References

Hindu philosophical concepts
Buddhist philosophical concepts
Jain philosophy